Featherstall Brook is a watercourse in Greater Manchester and a tributary of the River Roch.

Tributaries

Middle Wood Brook
Hills Brook

Rivers of the Metropolitan Borough of Rochdale
1